Qareh Gowzlu (also Romanized as Qareh Gowzlū; also known as Kharajuz, Qarah Gozlū, Qara Quzlu, and Qareh Gozlū) is a village in Qoltuq Rural District, in the Central District of Zanjan County, Zanjan Province, Iran. At the 2006 census, its population was 445, in 110 families.

References 

Populated places in Zanjan County